Kargartan (also Romanized as Kargartān; also known as Karkartān and Kūrtān) is a village in Quri Chay-ye Gharbi Rural District, Saraju District, Maragheh County, East Azerbaijan Province, Iran. At the 2006 census, its population was 109, in 22 families.

References 

Towns and villages in Maragheh County